Brickwood M. Galuteria (born 1955), is an American politician, radio host, musician and actor. He was the Hawaii State Senator representing District 12 of Honolulu. He previously served as state chairman of the Democratic Party of Hawaii (2004–2006).

Early years 
Brickwood M. Galuteria was born in 1955 in Honolulu, Hawaii, he is of Portuguese, Hawaiian, and Filipino descent. Galuteria was born and raised in the Kaka‘ako and Kapahulu areas and attended Kamehameha Schools since kindergarten. Galuteria's family were mostly blue-collar workers. His father, Arnold, worked for United Airlines and was president of his union. His mother, Juliette, worked for the City and County of Honolulu at City Hall. The family lived across from what now is the John A. Burns School of Medicine.

He attended Harvard University John F. Kennedy School of Government.

After high school and some college, Galuteria went to work for Hawaiian Airlines, eventually becoming an account executive and tour director.

Entertainment career 
Galuteria gave up corporate life to pursue interests in music and meeting people in the entertainment industry. He performed music with Marlene Sai at the Royal Hawaiian Hotel for three years and later forming a group of his own. He also won a coveted Na Hoku Hanohano Award in 1985 for Male Vocalist of the Year and Most Promising Artist.

In 1980, Galuteria began his radio career on air with KCCN 1420 AM, and later with KCCN-FM 100 and Hawaiian 105 KINE. He currently hosts the Na "Oiwi 'Olino "People Seeking Wisdom" morning show on AM940 KKNE with Kimo Kahoano.  Galuteria also worked in television, film and video, serving as host on such local shows as Hawaii's Kitchen, Treasures and the Easter Seals Telethon on KHON-2 and KITV4's Ho‘oulu Lahui Aloha.

Galuteria has been a spokesman for the State of  Hawaii's Department of Agriculture, the Hawaii Visitors and Convention Bureau, Bank of Hawaii and Mike McKenna's Windward Ford, in addition to commercial voice-over work he's done for numerous in-house TV, radio and political campaigns. He has also produced and promoted numerous productions, including the Aloha Festival Concerts, Miss Hawaii Pageants and the Coca-Cola Beach Concert Series.

He was an actor on television with roles on Hawaii Five-0 (2013) and Magnum, P.I. (1986).

Politics 
Galuteria served as chairman for the Democratic Party of Hawaii from 2004 until 2006. 

He served as the Hawaii State Senator, representing District 12 from November 4, 2008 until November 6, 2018. District 12 encompassed the communities of Waikiki, Ala Moana, Kaka'ako, and portions of McCully-Mo'ili'ili in Honolulu. He was elected to office in the 2008 general election and upon his swearing-in he was assigned to serve on the following four major committees: Ways & Means (WAM), Education & Housing (EDH), Public Safety and Military Affairs (PSM), and named Vice-Chair of the Committee on Tourism (TSM)

References 

 "The Party Line - Republican Sam Aiona and Democrat Brickwood Galuteria", by Dan Boylan  -  MidWeek Cover 08-24-2005

External links 

 

Hawaii Democrats
Living people
State political party chairs of Hawaii
1955 births
Na Hoku Hanohano Award winners
Kamehameha Schools alumni
21st-century American politicians